Post Regiment is the debut album of Polish punk rock band Post Regiment. The album was recorded in Złota Skała studio in Warsaw, between December 1991 and August 1992.

Track listing
"Hałas" (en.: The noise)
"Czarzły" (en.: Evil spell)
"Znaczy wiesz" (en.: It means you know)
"Religia" (en.: Religion)
"Wycieczka na pustynię" (en.: A trip to the desert)
"Numer" (en.: The number)
"Nowy dzień" (en.: A new day)
"Mrok" (en.: Darkness)
"Post" (en.: Lent)
"Jak dobrze" (en.: So good)
"Kolory" (en.: Colours)
"Skóra" (en.: Skin)
"Wstyd" (en.: Shame)
"Słowa o..." (en.: Words about...)
"Anioł" (en.: The angel)
"Ostatni raz" (en.: Last time)
"Farrus (to dla Ciebie ...)" (en.: Farrus (it's for you))
"Chory" (en.: The sick one)
"Catch another train" 
"Konie" (en.: Horses)
"Kurwy" (en.: Whores)
"Awareness" 
"Now I know"

Personnel
Max (drums)
Rolf (bass guitar)
Nika (vocals)
Janek (guitar)
Smok (guitar)

Resource
http://homepages.nyu.edu/~cch223/poland/albums/postregiment_postregiment.html URL accessed at 30 August 2006

1992 debut albums
Post Regiment albums